Shelter is a registered charity that campaigns for tenant rights in Great Britain. It gives advice, information and advocacy to people and lobbies government and local authorities for new laws and policies. It works in partnership with Shelter Cymru in Wales and the Housing Rights Service in Northern Ireland. The charity was founded in 1966 and raised 48.2 million pounds in 2020/21.

Shelter helps people in housing need by providing advice and practical assistance, and campaigns for better investment in housing and for laws and policies to improve the lives of homeless and badly housed people.

History
Shelter was launched on 1 December 1966, evolving out of the work on behalf of homeless people then being carried on in Notting Hill in London. The launch of Shelter hugely benefited from the coincidental screening, in November 1966, of the BBC television play Cathy Come Home ten days before Shelter's launch. It was written by Jeremy Sandford and directed by Ken Loach – and highlighted the plight of the homeless in Britain. Shelter was set up by the Rev Bruce Kenrick after forming the Notting Hill Housing Trust in 1963. The social campaigner Des Wilson, having seen Cathy Come Home, became pivotal in the development Shelter.

Unusually for a charity, in 2008 Shelter saw strike action by its staff in response to changes being made to their terms and conditions.

Financial information
For the year ended March 2017 (England) 
Total incoming resources: £60,902,000
Total expenditure: £62,874,000
Fundraising costs: £18,852,000
Total cost of charitable activities: £44,022,000

Sources of funding
Donations and legacies 54%
Housing advice and support services 29%
Shelter shops 14%
Training and publications 2%
Other 1%

See also
Shelter Cymru
Homelessness in the United Kingdom

References

External links
Shelter web site

Baron Pitt of Hampstead & Shelter - UK Parliament Living Heritage

Homelessness charities in the United Kingdom
Organizations established in 1966
Charities based in London
1969 establishments in the United Kingdom